The Active-class patrol boat was one of the most useful and long-lasting classes of United States Coast Guard cutters. Of the 35 built in the 1920s, 16 were still in service during the 1960s.

Design and construction 
The Active-class was designed for trailing the "mother ships" along the outer line of patrol during Prohibition. They were constructed at a cost of $63,173 USD each ($979,038.74 in 2021 rates). They gained a reputation for durability that was only enhanced by their re-engined in the late 1930s; their original 6-cylinder Winton 114-6 diesels were replaced by significantly more powerful 8-cylinder units that used the original engine beds and gave the vessels an additional 3 knots.  They were meant to be able to stay at sea for long periods of time in any kind of weather, and were able to expand berthing space via hammocks if the need arises, such as if a large number of survivors were on board.

Each ship was 125 feet [28.1 m] long, 23 feet 6 inches [7.1 m] wide, and had a draft of 7 feet 6 inches [2.1 m].

Equipment 
At launch, each cutter was fitted with a Winton Model 109 air compressor and Model 99 oil pump. A carbon dioxide fire suppression system was built by the Kidde Company, which in addition to water hoses powered by a seven and a half horsepower electric motors composed the ships' fire suppression. A 8,00-watt, 32 volt generator by the Hill Diesel Engine Company of Lansing, Michigan was driven by a 12 horsepower diesel engine which provided ship wide power.

History 
USCGC McLane is credited with the sinking of the inactive IJN submarine Ro-32. Ten  were refitted as buoy tenders between 1941 and 1942 and reverted to patrol work afterward.

Originally designated WPC, (Coast Guard patrol craft), they were re-designated WSC, for Coast Guard sub chaser, in February 1942.  The "W" appended to the SC (Sub Chaser) designation identified vessels as belonging to the U.S. Coast Guard. Those remaining in service in May 1966 were re-designated as medium endurance cutters, or WMEC.

The ships were informally nicknamed "Buck & a Quarters" in reference to their length, 100 feet (a buck, or $1.00) plus an additional 25 (A quarter, or 25 cents).

Notable events

1944 sinking of Jackson and Bedloe 
On 14 September 1944, USCGC Jackson (WSC-142) was instructed to rendezvous with the cutter USCGC Bedloe (WSC-128) and the tug USS Escape (ARS-6) to assist in the towing of the Liberty ship SS George Ade which had been torpedoed by the German submarine U-518 and driven ashore in a storm. After arriving in the area near the Outer Banks, weather conditions quickly deteriorated to hurricane conditions throughout the morning. Known as the Great Hurricane of 1944, the storm reportedly brought waves up to 100–125 feet (30–38 m) and 50-mile-per-hour winds. The ships were repeatedly thrown from the top of swells into the wave trough, causing heavy listing and impacting maneuverability and communications. At 10:30 AM Jackson capsized followed by Bedloe at 1:30. 37 crew members from Jackson and all 38 from Bedloe successfully made it off their ships, yet only 30 from Bedloe gained a hold on life rafts. High winds, waves, and sea pests hampered survival efforts as lifeboats were flipped and survivors scattered. The crews of both cutters believed they would be saved by the other, not knowing both ships have sunk. The lifeboats of Bedloe were spotted 51 hours after sinking and the Jackson's was seen 58 hours later. The rafts were spotted by a Coast Guard aircraft operating from Elizabeth City, North Carolina. Rescue aircraft began landing along with the crew members as the United States Navy blimps dropped emergency food and coordinated a rescue. A third 38-foot cutter from Oregon Inlet Lifeboat Station picked up survivors to be transferred to a navy minesweeper before being hospitalized at Norfolk, Virginia. 26 crew members from Bedloe and an additional 21 from Jackson died during the ordeal. The original mission, to tow George Ade into port, succeeded in the sense that the ship suffered minimal damage and no casualties.

1978 sinking of Cuyahoga 
On 20 October 1978 USCGC Cuyahoga (WIX-157) was underway in the Chesapeake Bay to train officer cadets with intentions to turn into port for the night. The cutter was the oldest in-service ship in the Coast Guards arsenal and had fallen into a state of disrepair from lack of maintenance. Natural low light levels made navigation harder with ships relying on signal lights for identification. The Cuyahoga was planning to turn into port when the lights of Argentine bulk cargo vessel M/V Santa Cruz II was spotted. The captain of the cutter considered the lights displayed to be that of a small fishing boat and failed to alter plans. This belief was further aided by the radar showing a small contact at range. The captain of Santa Cruz II believed the cutter would continue on course, allowing them to pass parallel to each other without incident. Cuyahoga believed the assumed smaller sailboat would see the large cutter turn and change course accordingly and committed to the plan. The Santa Cruz II sounded a whistle to notify that it would by the cutters duty to maneuver out of a collision, yet received no response. It was only when an accident was inevitable that both captains realized the situation as a whole and attempted to respond. The Santa Cruz sounded horns and signals, ordering all engines reverse and hard port while the cutter attempted to reverse. The two ships were too close to allow for any meaningful action. The bow of Santa Cruz II penetrated the cutter starboard corner of the wheelhouse, cutting a three-foot hole in the hull as it moved aft at 2107 local time. A one-foot high by two-foot wide hole opened four feet below the waterline which doomed the ship. The shock caused the Cuyahoga to tip 50 degrees to one side, throwing men and equipment overboard. Survivors were able to gain a hold on the 14 foot [4.2 m] utility boat which had broken off and risen to the surface. The ship sank in 2 minutes, killing 11 of 29 crew members. The surviving 18 sailors were rescued by the Santa Cruz II. An official investigation by the US Coast Guard credits the accident to Cuyahoga's captain with his failure to correctly identify signal lights of the oncoming vessel and ensuing decision to turn into a path for collision as the reason.

2021 sinking of Alert 
It has been reported that the former USCGC Alert (WMEC-127) sank on 1 November 2021 west of the I5 Bridge in Portland, Oregon in the Colombia River after being moored off Hayden Island. The ship fell into disrepair after a homeless encampment moved onboard, hampering hopes for preservation. The homeless groups and dock were removed December 2020, although officials had no long term plan for the ship as potential costs were too high. The vessel was heavily damaged by graffiti and stripped parts. Although not fully sunk, a light on top of the pilothouse can be seen in images as the ship rests in mud.  No cause of sinking has been announced.

Ships preserved
USCGC McLane is preserved at the Great Lakes Naval Memorial and Museum in Muskegon, Michigan.
USCGC Morris is preserved at the Liberty Maritime Museum in Sacramento, California.

Ship naming 
Each Active-class boat adopted the names of either officers or former cutters of the US Revenue Cutter Service, a predecessor of the Coast Guard. Several names were new for the time, while a name such as the Alert has been on the sides of six cutters by 1927. Most of the former cutters the boats were named after carried the name of a United States Secretary of the Treasury.

Ships in class

Gallery

Footnotes 
 The ten Actives used as buoy tenders were Active (WPC-125), Colfax (WPC-133), Crawford (WPC-134), Ewing (WPC-137), Harriet Lane (WPC-141), Legare (WPC-144), McLane (WPC-146), Vigilant (WPC-154), Diligence (WPC-135), and Woodbury (WPC-155).

References

Notes

Bibliography

Books 
Canney, Donald L. U.S. Coast Guard and Revenue cutters, 1790-1935. Annapolis, Md: Naval Institute Press, 1995. Print.  
Galecki, Bryan. Rum runners, U-boats, and hurricanes : the complete history of the Coast Guard cutters Bedloe and Jackson. Wilmington, N.C: Pine Belt Pub, 2005. Print.  
Gardiner, Robert, Przemysław Budzbon, and Robert Chesneau. Conway's All the World's Fighting Ships 1922-1946. Annapolis, Md: Naval Institute Press, 1984. Print.  
Shomette, Donald G. Shipwrecks on the Chesapeake : maritime disasters on Chesapeake Bay and its tributaries, 1608-1978. Centreville, Md: Tidewater Publishers, 1982. Print.

Journals

Websites 
"Active, 1927 (WSC 125)". United States Coast Guard. Retrieved 27 November 2021.
"WPC125 Active Cutters (1927)". Retrieved 1 January 2012.
"USCG Transports & Escorts: USS McLane (WSC-146)". www.ibiblio.org. Retrieved 9 December 2021.
"USCGC Jackson | Monitor National Marine Sanctuary". monitor.noaa.gov. Retrieved 16 November 2021.
"USCGC McLane (WSC-146)". museumships.us. Retrieved 23 June 2019.
"U.S. Coast Guard Cutter Morris". libertymaritime.com. Retrieved 29 December 2019.
"Bedloe, 1927 (WSC 128)". United States Coast Guard. Retrieved 15 November 2021.
"PACIFIC HUNTER". ShipSpotting. 19 May 2015. Retrieved 2 November 2021.
"Tour the Sea Scout ship | The News-Ledger". www.westsac.com. Retrieved 11 October 2021.
"RUSH (WSC-151) - Historical Collections of the Great Lakes". greatlakes.bgsu.edu. Retrieved 12 December 2021.
USCGC Cahoone (1927) at US Coast Guard Historian, which cites:
 Cutter History File. USCG Historian's Office, USCG HQ, Washington, D.C.
 Dictionary of American Naval Fighting Ships. Washington, DC: USGPO.
 Robert Scheina. U.S. Coast Guard Cutters & Craft of World War II. Annapolis, MD: Naval Institute Press, 1982.
 Robert Scheina. U.S. Coast Guard Cutters & Craft, 1946–1990. Annapolis, MD: Naval Institute Press, 1990.
 Rum Runners, U-Boats and Hurricanes: The Complete History of the Coast Guard Cutter Bedloe and Jackson.
 Brian Galecki, Publisher: Pine Belt Publishing, Publication date:12/19/2005

Documents

The Coast Guard at War Lost Cutters VIII. Public Information Division, US Coast Guard Headquarters. 1947. p. 15.

News

"Oregon has no timeline for removing abandoned military vessels on Columbia River". kgw.com. 27 July 2021. Retrieved 15 November 2021.

Newsroom Staff (3 November 2021). "Abandoned former Coast Guard vessel sinks in Columbia River, costing taxpayers". KOBI-TV NBC5 / KOTI-TV NBC2. Retrieved 15 November 2021.

Wong, Lui Kit (16 March 2018). "USCGC Tiger served at Pearl Harbor, used as floating hull at Tyee Marina". The News Tribune. Retrieved 15 November 2021.

English, Joseph (17 December 2020). "Crews clear 'Pirates of the Columbia' encampment". KATU. Retrieved 15 November 2021.

 
Brown, Boveri & Cie